Andrei Yurievich Khrzhanovsky (born 30 November 1939 in Moscow) is a Soviet and Russian animator, documentary filmmaker, writer and producer known for making art films. He is the father of director Ilya Khrzhanovsky. Married to philologist, editor and script doctor Maria Neyman. People's Artist of Russia (2011).

Career
He rose to prominence in the west with his 2009 picture Room and a Half starring Grigory Dityatkovsky, Sergei Yursky, Alisa Freindlich) about Joseph Brodsky. Although Khrzhanovsky's 1966 dark comedy There Lived Kozyavin was clearly a comment on the dangerous absurdity of a regimented communist bureaucracy, it was approved by the state owned Soyuzmultfilm studio. However, The Glass Harmonica in 1968, continuing a theme of heartless bureaucrats confronted by the liberating power of music and art, was the first animated film to be officially banned in the Soviet Union.

Filmography (selection)
Glass Harmonica (1968, short film)
A Fantastic Tale (1978)
A Pushkin Trilogy (1986)
The Lion with the White Beard (1995)
A Cat and a Half (2002)
Room and a Half (2009)

References

External links

The Glass Harmonica on Open Culture
Dangerous Minds article on The Glass Harmonica

1939 births
Living people
Gerasimov Institute of Cinematography alumni
People's Artists of Russia
Recipients of the Nika Award
State Prize of the Russian Federation laureates
Russian animated film directors
Russian animated film producers
Russian animators
Russian film directors
Soviet animation directors
Soviet animators
Russian activists against the 2022 Russian invasion of Ukraine